Goodenia arenicola is a species of flowering plant in the family Goodeniaceae and was endemic to Stradbroke Island in Queensland. It is a stolon-forming or rhizome-forming herb covered with soft hairs, with lance-shaped leaves mostly clustered at the end of short stems, and yellow flowers arranged singly in leaf axils. It is listed as extinct.

Description
Goodenia arenicola is a stolon- or rhizome-forming herb covered with soft hairs.

Taxonomy and naming
Goodenia arenicola was first formally described in 1990 Roger Charles Carolin in the journal Telopea from specimens collected on Stradbroke Island. The specific epithet (arenicola) means "sand-dweller".

Distribution and habitat
This goodenia is only known from the type location where it grew on stabilized sand dunes.

Conservation status
Goodenia arenicola is classified as "extinct" under the Queensland Government Nature Conservation Act 1992.

References

malvina
Flora of Queensland
Plants described in 1990
Taxa named by Roger Charles Carolin
Endemic flora of Australia